The 2006 Women's Premier Soccer League season was the 10th season of the WPSL. 

Long Island Fury finished the season as national champions.

Changes From 2005

Name Changes
Boston-North Aztecs changed their name to Boston Aztec Women
Elk Grove Pride changed their name to Sacramento Pride
St. Louis Archers changed their name to River Cities FC

New Franchises
Twenty franchises joined the league this year:

Folding
Three teams left the league prior to the beginning of the season:
Everton FC America - The Colony, Texas
Houston Stars - Houston, Texas
Steel City Sparks - Pittsburgh, Pennsylvania

Final standings
Purple indicates division title clinched

West Conference

Midwest Conference

Southern Conference

South Division

Southwest Division

East Conference

North Division

South Division

Playoffs

References

2006
Wom
1